Aret or ARET can refer to:
Aret, Iran, a village in Kermanshah Province, Iran
Arethusa (plant),  an orchid genus abbreviated Aret.
Accelerated Reduction/Elimination of Toxics, government program